She's Out is a British primetime television crime drama. The six-part series was produced by Cinema Verity for Carlton Television and screened on ITV in 1995. Written by Lynda La Plante as a sequel to her 1980's series, Widows, She's Out takes up the story of the central character, Dolly Rawlins, ten years after the events of the previous series. Ann Mitchell, who reprised her role as Dolly and Kate Williams, who played Audrey Withey, were the only cast members from the original series to appear in She's Out. The executive producer for the series was Verity Lambert and the series was directed by Ian Toynton, both of whom had worked on the original series.

It begins with Dolly Rawlins' release from prison after serving a five-year sentence for the murder of Harry, her husband. She teams up with several other parolees and make plans to stage a train robbery on horseback. Dolly's new companions in crime were fellow former inmates, brothel madam Ester Freeman (Linda Marlowe), Julia Lawson (Anna Patrick), a doctor who sold prescriptions to finance her heroin habit, arms dealer and fence Gloria Radford (Maureen Sweeney), prostitute Connie Stephens (Zoe Heyes), Angela Dunn (Indra Ove), a young woman embroiled in Ester's vice schemes and forger Kathleen O'Reilly (Maggie McCarthy).

The series was released on Region 2 DVD.

Cast
Ann Mitchell as Dolly Rawlins
Linda Marlowe as Ester Freeman
Maureen Sweeney as Gloria Radford
Anna Patrick as Julia Lawson
Zoe Heyes as Connie Stephens
Indra Ové as Angela Dunn
Maggie McCarthy as Kathleen O'Reilly
Adrian Rawlins as D.S. Mike Withey
Kate Williams as Audrey Withey
Hugh Quarshie as D.C.I. Ron Craigh
Douglas McFerran as D.S. John Palmer
Sophie Heyman as Susan Withey
Terence Beesley as Jim Douglas
Huggy Leaver as Eddie Radford
Richard Lintern as John Maynard
Buffy Davis as Norma Walker
Antony Webb as Jimmy Donaldson

Episode list

References

External links

1995 British television series debuts
1995 British television series endings
1990s British drama television series
British crime drama television series
ITV television dramas
1990s British television miniseries
Television series by Fremantle (company)
Television shows set in Buckinghamshire
Carlton Television
English-language television shows
1990s British crime television series
Sequel television series